Inspector Willoughby is a cartoon character created by Walter Lantz, and named after the Hollywood avenue which runs alongside the building where Lantz's office was housed (at 861 Seward Street). 12 cartoons were produced between 1960 and 1965. His cartoons were often shown on The Woody Woodpecker Show alongside Woody Woodpecker, Chilly Willy and Andy Panda.

Bio
Inspector Willoughby (AKA Secret Agent 6 7/8) was a secret agent with droopy eyes, a bushy mustache, and laconic voice. He solved mysteries and fought crime. He was very similar to Tex Avery's Droopy in voice and stature. When on the job, he always goes after any villains which ends with them behind bars. Despite his diminutive height, he is able to physically restrain and use impressive judo moves on men twice his size. It was established in the cartoon short "Mississippi Slow Boat" that his first name is Stuart.

Inspector Willoughby also had other jobs outside of his secret agent work, such as a truant officer, male nurse, and park ranger. It has been speculated that he has relatives in those jobs. The first appearance of a Willoughby character was a cannery security guard in Salmon Yeggs (1958). Although small bald men have also been seen in The Clip Joint, Billion Dollar Boner and Hunger Strife, they were not "true" Willoughbies.

Episodes
 Hunger Strife (Oct 31, 1960)
 Rough and Tumbleweed (Jan 30, 1961)
 Eggnapper (Feb 27, 1961)
 Mississippi Slow Boat (July 31, 1961)
 The Case of the Red-Eyed Ruby (Dec 11, 1961)
 Phoney Express (May 14, 1962)
 Hyde and Sneak (July 23, 1962)
 Coming Out Party (Jan 25, 1963)
 Case of the Cold Storage Yegg (Feb 15, 1963)
 Hi-Seas Hi-Jacker (July 5, 1963)
 The Case of the Maltese Chicken (Feb 14, 1964)
 The Case of the Elephant's Trunk (Jan 30, 1965)

References

External links
 
 Inspector Willoughby at Don Markstein's Toonopedia. Archived from the original on September 16, 2015.

Film characters introduced in 1958
Woody Woodpecker
Fictional detectives
Fictional judoka
Fictional secret agents and spies in films
Universal Pictures cartoons and characters
Walter Lantz Productions cartoons and characters
Male characters in animation